Lucerapex schepmani is a species of sea snail, a marine gastropod mollusk in the family Turridae, the turrids.

The specific name schepmani is in honor of Dutch malacologist Mattheus Marinus Schepman.

Description
The length of the shell attains 9.5 mm.

This species was originally described by M.M. Schepman as one specimen out of ten Surcula variabilis, but redescribed by T. Shuto.

Distribution
This marine species occurs in the Ceram Sea, Indonesia.

References

External links
 Shuto, Tsugio. "Taxonomical notes on the turrids of the Siboga-Collection originally described by MM Schepman, 1913 (Part II)." Venus (Japanese Journal of Malacology) 29.2 (1970): 37-_53.

schepmani
Gastropods described in 1970